In Mandaeism, Gubran is an uthra (angel or guardian). He is also referred to as Gubran Uthra. Guban is the female consort of Gubran.

In Mandaean scriptures

In the Mandaean Book of John, Gubran Uthra helps Nbaṭ lead a rebellion against Yushamin and his 21 sons. Chapter 3 mentions Gubran's vehicle as Paraheil, a heavenly steed or warhorse.

Gubran is also mentioned in Right Ginza 5.1 as one of the uthras appointed over the north by Yawar Ziwa to watch over Ur.

See also
Nbat
Nsab
List of angels in theology

References

Uthras
Individual angels
Guardians of the directions